Ralph Berner (born 28 March 1968) is a German former cyclist. He competed in the men's cross-country mountain biking event at the 1996 Summer Olympics.

References

External links
 

1968 births
Living people
German male cyclists
Olympic cyclists of Germany
Cyclists at the 1996 Summer Olympics
People from Odenwaldkreis
Sportspeople from Darmstadt (region)
German mountain bikers
Cyclo-cross cyclists
Cyclists from Hesse